The 2000 Montana State Bobcats football team was an American football team that represented Montana State University in the Big Sky Conference (Big Sky) during the 2000 NCAA Division I-AA football season. In their first season under head coach Mike Kramer, the Bobcats compiled a 0–11 record (0–8 against Big Sky opponents) and finished in last place in the Big Sky.

In the 100th meeting in the Montana–Montana State football rivalry, the Bobcats lost, marking their 15th consecutive loss in the series.

Schedule

References

Montana State
Montana State Bobcats football seasons
College football winless seasons
Montana State Bobcats football